The Beneteau First 235 is a French sailboat, that was designed by Group Finot and first built in 1986.

Production
The boat design was built by Beneteau in France and the United States between 1986 and 1991, with 680 examples completed, but it is now out of production.

Design

The First 235 is a small recreational keelboat, built predominantly of glassfibre. It has a fractional sloop rig, a transom-hung rudder and a fixed fin keel, wing keel or optionally a centreboard. It displaces  and carries  of ballast.

The boat is normally fitted with a small outboard motor for docking and maneuvering.

The design has a PHRF racing average handicap of 189 with the swing keel or the fin keel and 195 with the wing keel.

Operational history
In a 2010 review Steve Henkel wrote, "here is a boat you might call elegant, if you like the French approach to design—all rounded corners and brushed aluminum. It may take time to get over the idea that she's not 23 1/2 feet long, (She's really only 21' 8" on deck, without the rudder, and even her official LOA is only 23' 4"...so where does the "235" come from? Marketing!) ... Best features: Roomy cabin with good headroom and enclosed head. Very pretty, very sleek, very ... French. Worst features: That aft berth under the cockpit is a bear to climb into or out of."

See also
List of sailing boat types

Similar sailboats
Bluenose one-design sloop
Hunter 23
O'Day 23
Paceship 23
Paceship PY 23
Precision 23
Rob Roy 23
Schock 23
Sonic 23
Stone Horse
Watkins 23

References

External links

Keelboats
1980s sailboat type designs
Sailing yachts
Sailboat type designs by Groupe Finot
Sailboat types built by Beneteau